The Jydegaard Formation (also spelled as 'Jydegård') is a geological formation dating to the Early Cretaceous, about 145-139 million years ago. It is on the island of Bornholm, Denmark. Vertebrate fossils have been found in the formation.

Fossil content 
Thin bone fragments have been uncovered that may belong to pterosaurs or birds.

Dinosaurs 
A tooth possibly belonging to a juvenile titanosaur has been found in the formation.

Crocodylomorphs

Fish 
Fish remains have been found in coprolites possibly belonging to the dromaeosaur Dromaeosauroides or marine turtles. Also, unidentified pycnodont jaws and two small stem-teleosteans have been uncovered. Amioid scales have also been revealed.

Turtles 
Unidentified turtle carapaces have been uncovered in the Formation.

Lizards 
A lower jaw from a lizard has been recovered from the formation.

Bivalves

See also 
 List of fossiliferous stratigraphic units in Denmark

References

Further reading 
 J. Rees. 2000. An Early Cretaceous scincomorph lizard dentary from Bornholm, Denmark. Bulletin of the Geological Society of Denmark 48:105-109

Geologic formations of Denmark
Lower Cretaceous Series of Europe
Cretaceous Denmark
Berriasian Stage
Valanginian Stage
Sandstone formations
Shale formations
Lagoonal deposits
Paleontology in Denmark
Formations